The 2014–15 Welsh Premier League is the sixth season of the Women's Welsh Premier League, the top level women's football league in Wales.

Cardiff Met. Ladies were the defending champions and retained the title on goal difference over Swansea City.

Lyndsey Davies from PILCS won the top scorer award for a second year in a row.

Clubs

For this season Llandudno Junction renamed to Llandudno Ladies and moved to 3G facility at Maesdu Park. Llanidloes Ladies was renamed to Hafren United Ladies FC. They however withdraw from the league before the start of the season. Caernarfon had withdrawn from the league after the 2013/14 season, they were replaced by Aberystwyth Town. Hafren United though also withdraw before the league starts, thus this season is played only with eleven teams.

Standings
No team was relegated because Hafren United withdrew before the season.

League Cup
For the second time a League Cup was played. In the first round four teams (Hafren United, Caernarfon Town, Cwmbran Celtic and Cardiff City FC) were drawn to receive a bye to the second round. After Hafren United withdrew from the league, one team was drawn to have a bye in the quarter-finals. Caernarfon were replaced by Aberystwyth Town after they withdrew last season. PILCS won the final 3–2 over Swansea City to win their first nationwide trophy.

|}

References

External links
welshpremier.com
welsh-premier.com
League at uefa.com

2013-14
Wales Women
2014–15 in Welsh football leagues
1